Michael or Mike O'Brien may refer to:

Politicians
 Michael O'Brien (Fianna Fáil politician), Irish former councillor and mayor of Clonmel
 Michael O'Brien (Ohio politician) (born 1955), American politician in the state of Ohio
 Michael O'Brien (South Australian politician) (born 1949), Australian Labor Party member of the South Australian House of Assembly, 2002–
 Micheal O'Brien (Canadian politician), Retired politician, now Editor-in-chief of the global edition of Feminine-Perspective Magazine.
present
 Michael O'Brien (Victorian politician) (born 1971), Liberal Party of Australia member of the Victorian Legislative Assembly, 2006–present
 Michael H. O'Brien (1954–2018), American politician in the commonwealth of Pennsylvania
 Michael J. O'Brien (born 1939), American politician in the state of Iowa
 Michael John O'Brien (1851–1940), Canadian politician, railway builder, industrialist and philanthropist
 Mike O'Brien (British politician) (born 1954), United Kingdom Labour Party politician
 Mike O'Brien (Canadian politician), mayor of Fredericton, New Brunswick

 Mike O'Brien (Seattle politician) (born 1968), American politician

Sports
 Michael O'Brien (Australian rules footballer) (born 1980), West Coast Eagles
 Michael O'Brien (fencer) (born 1969), Irish fencer
 Michael O'Brien (hurling manager) (1933–2014), Irish Catholic priest and former hurling manager
 Michael O'Brien (Irish sportsman), Irish association footballer, Gaelic footballer and cricketer in the 1920s
 Mike O'Brien (swimmer) (born 1965), American swimmer
 Micheál O'Brien (1923–2015), Irish Gaelic footballer and hurler
 Mike O'Brien (hurler) (born 1978), Irish hurler

Others
 Michael O'Brien (American poet) (born 1939), American poet
 Michael O'Brien (Canadian author) (born 1948), Canadian author
 Michael O'Brien (game designer), Australian game designer
 Michael O'Brien (historian) (1948–2015), American historian
 Michael O'Brien (musician) (born 1964), American musician
 Michael O'Brien (photographer) (born 1950), American photographer
 Michael K. O'Brien, visual effects artist
 Mike O'Brien (actor) (born 1976), American writer and performer on Saturday Night Live
 Mike O'Brien (game developer), co-founder, ArenaNet; game designer and programmer

Characters
 Guardsman (Michael O'Brien), a fictional character in the Iron Man comics
 Michael O'Brien, a fictional engineer character in the 1940 Christmas film Beyond Tomorrow

See also
 Mick O'Brien (disambiguation)